Fred Augustus Gorden (born February 22, 1940) is a retired major general in the United States Army. He graduated from the United States Military Academy in 1962 and was the first African-American to serve as Commandant of Cadets. Gorden also earned an M.A. degree in Spanish language and literature from Middlebury College in 1969.

Promoted to colonel on August 7, 1980, Gorden served as commander of Division Artillery, 7th Infantry Division at Fort Ord. Promoted to brigadier general on October 1, 1985, he served as assistant commander of the 7th Infantry Division and then as the 61st Commandant of Cadets at the Military Academy. As a major general, Gorden assumed command of the 25th Infantry Division at Schofield Barracks in January 1990. He served as commander of the Army Military District of Washington from May 20, 1993 to August 29, 1995. His final assignment was as chief of public affairs for the Department of the Army. Gorden retired from active duty effective October 1, 1996.

His honors include the Legion of Merit, two Army Distinguished Service Medals and the Defense Distinguished Service Medal.

References

1940 births
Living people
People from Anniston, Alabama
United States Military Academy alumni
African-American United States Army personnel
United States Army Rangers
United States Army personnel of the Vietnam War
Recipients of the Air Medal
Middlebury College alumni
Recipients of the Meritorious Service Medal (United States)
Recipients of the Legion of Merit
United States Army generals
Recipients of the Distinguished Service Medal (US Army)
Recipients of the Defense Distinguished Service Medal
21st-century African-American people
African Americans in the Vietnam War
20th-century African-American people